MLLT6, PHD finger containing is a protein that in humans is encoded by the MLLT6 gene.

References

Further reading